Edward Eggleston (December 10, 1837 – September 3, 1902) was an American historian and novelist.

Biography
Eggleston was born in Vevay, Indiana, to Joseph Cary Eggleston and Mary Jane Craig. The author George Cary Eggleston was his brother.  As a child, he was too ill to regularly attend school, so his education was primarily provided by his father. He was ordained as a Methodist minister in 1856. He wrote a number of tales, some of which, especially the "Hoosier" series, attracted much attention. Among these are The Hoosier Schoolmaster, The Hoosier Schoolboy, The End of the World, The Faith Doctor, and Queer Stories for Boys and Girls.

He wrote many articles for the children's magazine The Little Corporal, and in 1866 he worked as an editor for the periodical. In December 1866 he accepted a higher-paying editorial position at The Sunday School Teacher.

Eggleston was elected a member of the American Antiquarian Society in 1893.

His boyhood home at Vevay, known as the Edward and George Cary Eggleston House, was listed on the National Register of Historic Places in 1973.

His summer home, Owl's Nest, in Lake George, New York, eventually became his year-round home.
Eggleston died there in 1902, at the age of 64. Owl's Nest was declared a National Historic Landmark in 1971. His daughter, the writer, Elizabeth Eggleston Seelye, was married to Elwyn Seelye, the founder of the New York State Historical Association.

Principal works 

Novels
 The Hoosier Schoolmaster (1871)
 The End of the World (1872)
 The Mystery of Metropolisville (1873)
 The Circuit Rider (1874)
 Roxy (1878)
 The Graysons (1888)
 The Faith Doctor (1891)
 Duffels (short stories) (1893)

Juvenile

 Mr. Blake's Walking Stick (1870)
 Tecumseh and the Shawnee Prophet (1878)
 Pocahontus and Powhatan (1879)
 Montezuma (1880)
 The Hoosier Schoolboy (1883)
 Queer Stories for Boys and Girls (1884)
 Stories of Great Americans for Little Americans (1895)
 Home History of the United States (1889)

History
 A History of the United States and Its People (1888)
 The Beginners of a Nation (1896)
 The Transit of Civilization From England to America (1901)
 New Centennial History of the United States (1904)

Religion
 Christ in Art (1875)

Notes

References
 
 "Eggleston, Edward." American Authors 1600–1900 The H. W. Wilson Company, New York, 1938

External links

 
 
 
The Transit of Civilization from England to America in the Seventeenth Century

1837 births
1902 deaths
19th-century American historians
19th-century American novelists
Presidents of the American Historical Association
Novelists from Indiana
People from Vevay, Indiana
People from Lake George, New York
American male novelists
19th-century American male writers
Members of the American Antiquarian Society
American male non-fiction writers
Historians from New York (state)
Members of the American Academy of Arts and Letters